R (Coughlan) v North and East Devon Health Authority [1999] EWCA Civ 1871 is a UK enterprise law case, concerning health care in the UK.

Facts 
Miss Coughlan claimed she should be able to remain at Mardon House, Exeter, purpose built for her and seven others with severe disabilities. After a 1971 road traffic accident, she became tetraplegic, needing constant care. Devon HA decided it should be closed in 1996, although she had been assured before it was a ‘home for life’. The Health Authority argued Mardon House had become ‘a prohibitively expensive white elephant’ which ‘left fewer resources available for other services’.

Judgment
The Court of Appeal held there was a legitimate expectation to fair treatment, with a substantive benefit of the ‘home for life’. Frustrating the expectation would be an abuse of power. However the duty to promote health, in statute, was not a duty to ensure the service was comprehensive.

Lord Woolf MR said that the failure to keep the home open was ‘equivalent to a breach of contract in private law’. He said the following.

ECHR article 8 was also discussed.

See also

United Kingdom enterprise law

Notes

References

United Kingdom enterprise case law
United Kingdom administrative case law
United Kingdom constitutional case law